Roark Township is an inactive township in Gasconade County, in the U.S. state of Missouri.

Roark Township was established in 1834, taking its name from the local Roark family of pioneer citizens.

References

Townships in Missouri
Townships in Gasconade County, Missouri